Katia Gutiérrez (born 29 April 1989) is a Mexican professional boxer who held the IBF female mini flyweight title from 2011 to 2013. She also challenged for the IBF female junior flyweight title in 2011; the WBC female mini flyweight title in 2014; and the WBA female mini flyweight title in 2016.

Professional career
Gutiérrez made her professional debut on 10 August 2007, scoring a four-round majority decision (MD) victory against Guadalupe Cortes at the Polideportivo Centenario in Los Mochis, Mexico.

After compiling a record of 11–2 (3 KOs) she faced Irma Sánchez for the inaugural IBF female junior flyweight title on 22 January 2011 at the Arena Neza in Ciudad Nezahualcóyotl, Mexico. Gutiérrez suffered through third defeat of her career, losing via unanimous decision (UD) over ten rounds.

Three months later she challenged for her second world title—the inaugural IBF female mini flyweight title—against former world champion Hollie Dunaway on 16 April at the World Trade Center in Boca del Río, Mexico. Gutiérrez defeated Dunaway via UD with the judges' scorecards reading 99–91, 98–92, and 97–93. After four successful defences, Gutiérrez was stripped of the title in 2012.

After three more fights—a UD victory against Kareli Lopez in April 2013; a split decision (SD) defeat to Irma Sánchez in a September 2013 rematch; and a UD victory against Brenda Flores in April 2014—Gutiérrez faced WBC female mini flyweight champion  on 1 November 2014 at Acros in Fukuoka, Japan. Gutiérrez suffered the fifth defeat of her career, losing via SD. One judge scored the bout 97–93 in favour of Gutiérrez while the other two scored it 96–94 to Kuroki.

In her next fight she suffered a technical decision (TD) against former world champion Kenia Enríquez in November 2015. The bout was stopped in the fifth round after Gutiérrez received a cut above her left eye from an accidental clash of heads.

Following the defeat to Enríquez, Gutiérrez fought for her fourth world title, facing WBA female mini flyweight champion Anabel Ortiz on 30 April 2016 at Malecon Turistico in Guaymas, Mexico. Gutiérrez suffered her third consecutive defeat and the seventh of her career, losing via shutout UD with two judges scoring the bout 99–91 and the third scoring it 98–92.

She bounced back from defeat with four victories in 2019; Karla Islas in May and Heidy Cruz in July, both by technical knockout (TKO); a UD in a rematch with Cruz in October; and a SD (96–92, 96–92, 93–95) against Joana Pastrana on 23 November, capturing the vacant WBC Silver female mini flyweight title at the Pabellón Ciudad Deportiva Navafría in Moralzarzal, Spain.

Professional boxing record

References

External links

Living people
1989 births
Mexican women boxers
Boxers from Sinaloa
Sportspeople from Los Mochis
Mini-flyweight boxers
Light-flyweight boxers
International Boxing Federation champions
21st-century Mexican women